Jaikrishan Jajoo  (born 23 September 1960) is the Founder of Shubhashish Group & Jagriti (NGO) and is an Indian business magnate, investor and philanthropist.

Early life 
Jajoo was born to Dr. BalKrishan Jajoo, a retired CMHO, Government of Rajasthan and Mrs. Geeta Devi Jajoo. He is married to Mrs. Neeta Jajoo in 1983.

In 1983, he started his business career with a cement distribution agency, there after started various other businesses such as pharmaceutical distribution, garment manufacturing and export till 1987.

Career 
1987 was a landmark year for Jajoo as he started his wealth management company which is now known as Shubhashish Wealth Management Consultants Pvt Ltd (SWMC). SWMC under the leadership of Mr. J. K. Jajoo has now grown into one of the leaders in this field and does wealth management for top corporate houses, HNI's across India. Thereafter, he added other businesses under the umbrella of Shubhashish Group, like real estate investments, real estate development, packaging, logistics, IT services, and various IT products.

2001 was another landmark year for Mr. J.K. Jajoo, as he co-founded Jagriti, an NGO working towards social welfare. Jagriti, under his leadership, started working in various domains like Mobile Mortuary Service, Cancer Detection Camps, Plantation, Cleanliness Drives, Eye Donation, Body Donation and most importantly, Education for the Underprivileged. J.K. Jajoo is associated with various organizations like Rotary International, TiE, JCF, MFJCF, The Maheshwari Samaj and JCF.

J.K. Jajoo has been made a member of the High Power Committee by a double bench of Rajasthan High Court to make Jaipur a World Class City. This committee is headed by the Chief Secretary, Govt. of Rajasthan.

He is member of  State Advisory Committee for Cadaver (Brain death donor) Organ donation.

Business

Shubhashish Group today is a conglomerate, based in Rajasthan. Various brands working under the group are:

Shubhashish Wealth Management Consultants LLP
Shubhashish Real Estate Services Pvt Ltd
Shubhashish Builders & Developers
Shubhashish IT Services Limited
Shubhashish Homes LLP
Jaipur Supreme Packaging Pvt Ltd
KJ Logistics
JB IT Services LLP
Shubh Soundarya Landmark Pvt Ltd

The group is headquartered at Shubhashish Corporate Tower, in Jaipur.

Various positions held as of 2017

Shubhashish Group: Founder, Chairman & Managing Director.
Jagriti: Author, Founder, President & Managing Trustee.
JCF (Jaipur Citizen Forum) & MFJCF (Mohan Foundation and Jaipur Citizen Forum): Convener (programs), Trustee.
Rotary International: President (Rotary Club Jaipur Midtown, 2014-2015), Past Chairman (Education Committee, District 3052).
TiE: Charter Member, TiE Rajasthan.
The Maheshwari Samaj: Past Executive Member.
CII:  Member and Past Chairman of CSR activities and CII's “Affirmative Action” panel.

Philanthropy
As of today, Jagriti has adopted and is running 14 schools, with approximately 4000 children in total.

Jagriti is supported by various donors and big institutions located at various parts of the country and the world. Some of them are Colourful Life Foundation, Tata Projects, Round Table India, Carrie Morgridge, Rotary International, C.K.Birla Group etc.

Honours and awards

National Youth Award: Awarded with National Award on behalf of Jagriti by Ministry of Youth Affairs, Government of India in a function on 12 January 2018 where the Chief Guest was Shri. Narendra Modi, Prime Minister of India. The award was given by Mr. Yogi Adityanath, Chief Minister of Uttar Pradesh and Minister of Youth affairs Mr. Rajyavardhan Singh.

Bhamashah Award: Government of Rajasthan has honored him on behalf of Jagriti with coveted Bhamashah Award on 28 June 2016 by The Hon’ble Shri Kailash Meghwal, the Speaker of the Rajasthan Legislative Assembly and Shri Vasudev Devnani (Education Minister).

International Vaish Federation Award: He was felicitated by International Vaish Federation for his outstanding contribution in transforming the lives of underprivileged children by educating them and making a huge difference in their lives on 30.5.16 by Health Minister Shri Rajendra Singh Rathore; PHED Minister Mrs Kiran Maheshwari; Higher Education Minister Shri Kalicharan Saraf and Founder President of Vaish Foundation Shri Ramdasji Agarwal.

Personal life 
He has two children, Mudita Maheshwari (born: 15 December 1984) and Mohit Jajoo (born: 11 May 1992).

References

Living people
Indian Hindus
Indian industrialists
1960 births